The Oak Grove Cemetery, originally known as the Presbyterian Cemetery, is located on South Main Street in downtown Lexington, Virginia, less than a mile from the campuses of Washington and Lee University and the Virginia Military Institute. The cemetery was renamed in 1949 as the Stonewall Jackson Memorial Cemetery after the Confederate general, who was buried here in 1863. The current name dates to September 3, 2020.  Also buried here are 144 Confederate veterans, two Governors of Virginia, and Margaret Junkin Preston, the "Poet Laureate of the Confederacy".

Name 

The cemetery was first known as the Presbyterian Cemetery. After the Lexington Presbyterian Church conveyed the cemetery to the city in 1949, the cemetery was renamed later that year for the Confederate general Stonewall Jackson, who was interred there after his death on May 10, 1863. The Lexington City Council unanimously voted to rename the cemetery in 2020 following the George Floyd protests, and the renaming was unanimously approved on September 3.

Notable burials

Jackson and his family
The plot of Jackson and his family received a sculpture of Jackson in 1895, created by sculptor Edward V. Valentine. The plot includes graves of:
 Thomas Jonathan "Stonewall" Jackson (1824–1863): VMI instructor, Confederate Army lieutenant general, commander of Second Corps, Army of Northern Virginia
 Elinor Junkin Jackson (1825–1854): Jackson's first wife, died in childbirth; buried with their stillborn son
 Mary Anna Morrison Jackson (1831–1915): Jackson's second wife
 Thomas and Anna Morrison Jackson's two daughters:
 Mary Graham Jackson (infant – 1858)
 Julia Laura Jackson Christian (1862–1889) and her husband William Edmund Christian (1856–1936)
 Thomas Jonathan Jackson Christian Sr. (1888–1952): William and Julia Christian's second child, U.S. Army brigadier general
 Cenotaph for his son Thomas Jonathan Jackson Christian Jr. (1915–1944), U.S. Army colonel, killed during World War II (believed buried at Faubourg-d'Amiens Cemetery, Arras, France)

Others
 John White Brockenbrough (1806–1870): Federal judge, Confederate Congressman, founder of the School of Law at Washington College (now Washington and Lee University)
 John Mercer Brooke (1826–1906): Sailor, engineer, inventor, commander in the Confederate States Navy
 Benjamin Darst (1760–1835): Revolutionary War Soldier, noted Architect / Builder of Lexington Landmark Structures
 John William Elrod (1939–2001): President, Washington and Lee University
 William Gilham (1818–1872): VMI instructor, Confederate Army colonel
 George Junkin (1790–1868), Presbyterian minister and educator, President of Washington College (now Washington and Lee University), father of Elinor Junkin Jackson
 Beverly Tucker Lacy (1819–1900), Presbyterian minister, chaplain of Jackson's Second Corps, Army of Northern Virginia
 Edwin Gray Lee (1836–1870): Confederate Army general, member of Jackson's staff
 John Letcher (1813–1884): Governor of Virginia (1860–1864)
 Charles McDowell, Jr. (1926–2010): Journalist, regular panelist on PBS series Washington Week in Review
 James McDowell (1795–1851): Governor of Virginia (1843–1846), Congressman (1846–51)
 Elisha Franklin Paxton (1828–1863): Confederate Army general, commander of the Stonewall Brigade, killed at Chancellorsville
 Alexander Swift "Sandie" Pendleton (1840–1864): Confederate Army lieutenant colonel, member of Jackson's, Ewell's and Early's staffs, killed at Fisher's Hill
 William Nelson Pendleton (1809–1883): Episcopal priest, Confederate Army brigadier general, chief of artillery, Army of Northern Virginia, father of Sandie Pendleton
 John Thomas Lewis Preston (1811–1890): Founder and organizer of Virginia Military Institute
 Margaret Junkin Preston (1820–1897): Called unofficially "Poet Laureate of the Confederacy"; daughter of George Junkin
 Absalom Willis Robertson (1887–1971): U.S. Senator, father of evangelist Pat Robertson
 George R. E. Shell (1908–1996): Ninth superintendent of VMI, Marine Corps Brigadier General
 Scott Shipp (1839–1917): Commandant of the VMI Corps of Cadets at the Battle of New Market, second superintendent of VMI
 Francis Henney Smith (1812–1890): First superintendent of VMI, Confederate Army colonel, Virginia militia major general
 William D. Washington (1833–1870): Painter, instructor at VMI
 John Delane Wilson (1931–2013): President of Washington and Lee University (1983–1995) and Wells College (1969–1975); first Rhodes Scholar from Michigan State University and member of their national championship football teams

References

External links

 
 

Cemeteries in Virginia
Tourist attractions in Lexington, Virginia
Cemetery
Confederate States of America monuments and memorials in Virginia
Confederate States of America cemeteries
Name changes due to the George Floyd protests